This is a list of alleged sightings of unidentified flying objects or UFOs in Brazil.

1947 
 On 23 July 1947, topographer José Higgins was working with many laborers in Bauru, São Paulo. Suddenly, they heard an extremely sharp sound. Some moments later, they saw a lens-shaped object landing near them. The workmen run away leaving Higgins alone. The man reported that three humanoid figures emerged from the UFO and spoke to him in an unknown language; after about a half-hour, they returned to the UFO which then took them away.

1952 
 On 5 May 1952, the journalist Joao Martins and the photographer Eduardo Keffel claimed to have seen a flying disk in the vicinity of Barra da Tijuca. Keffel took some photographs of the UFO, which were published by the magazine O Cruzeiro.

1957 
 On 13 September 1957 The journalist Ibrahim Sued received an envelope containing a letter and three fragments of metal. The author of the letter wrote that he saw a UFO which exploded in the sky over the beach of Ubatuba; he collected some fragments and sent three of these to the journal together with the letter. Sued sent the fragments to a laboratory which analyzed them and discovered that they consisted of pure magnesium. James Harder and other ufologists came to the conclusion that the fragments of Ubatuba have an extraterrestrial origin, but other investigators think that this story is a hoax.
 Antonio Villas Boas claimed to have been abducted by extraterrestrials on 16 October 1957.  Though similar stories had circulated for years beforehand, Boas's claims was among the first alien abduction stories to receive wide attention.
 On the evening of 4 November 1957, two sentinels at the Itaipu Fort, (Praia Grande, São Paulo) suffered moderate burns after being hit by a heat wave from an unidentified  flying object, which allegedly came descending from the sky. The entire electricity of the fort, including the emergency circuits, went down during the incident. Afterwards, Brazilian Army and United States Air Force (USAF) personnel, along with investigators of the Brazilian Air Force, flew to the fort to interview the soldiers. USAF's Donald Keyhoe expressed his opinions on the case:

In 2008, a document reporting the incident was written at the Brazilian Embassy in the United States.

1958 

 At 12:00 pm of 16 January 1958, the Brazilian ship Almirante Saldanha, taking part in projects of the Ano Geofísico Internacional, was preparing to sail away from Ilha de Trindade, off the coast of Espírito Santo.  Captain Viegas was on the deck with several scientists and members of the crew when he suddenly noticed a flying object, which had a “ring” around it, just like Saturn. Everyone reportedly saw the UFO at the same time.  It came to the island from the east, flew towards the Pico Desejado (Wished Peak), made a step turn and went away very quickly to the northwest.  As soon as the object was noticed Almiro Baraúna was requested for photographing. After getting the camera and going up the quarter-deck, he stated that he managed to take pictures of the object.

1966 

Two men were found dead near Niterói. Both were wearing lead masks. A UFO allegedly was seen flying near the point where both died.

1977 
 The Colares flap refers to an outbreak of UFO sightings that occurred in 1977 on the Brazilian island of Colares. During the outbreak, the UFOs allegedly attacked the citizens with intense beams of radiation that left burn marks and puncture wounds. These sightings led to the Brazilian government dispatching a team to investigate under the codename Operation Saucer (Portuguese: Prato, see below), but the government later recalled the team and classified the files until the late 1990s.

This was the first operation of the Brazilian Air Force conducted only to investigate UFO-related issues. This operation was started shortly after the Colares UFO flap.

1979 
 On the evening of 28 July 1979, security guard Antonio Carlos Ferreira was allegedly abducted from his workplace - a furniture factory in Mirassol, São Paulo. According to his own accounts, he was approached by three humanoid figures who tranquilized and took him aboard a small ship which ferried him to a larger craft further away. There, he said he was positioned in front of a large television-like device and presented with a variety of images before being forced to mate with a female alien, after which he was tranquilized again and returned to the ground. They lacked eyebrows or eyelashes and spoke in a language that superficially resembled Japanese. Some were said to have dark skin and red curly hair, while others had light skin and straight black hair. The ship was spherical with three undercarriage-like legs protruding from the bottom, with the interior lit by bright red and green lights. Ferreira states that he encountered the aliens again in 1982, with the craft supposedly landing close enough for him to see the female alien and a childlike alien observing him from a distance. He said he experienced a third encounter later in 1982 in which he was taken into the hangar of an alien craft via a green beam of light before being injected with a yellow substance. He said he was then taken to meet the two aliens once more, the younger of whom he was led to believe was his own child. Other encounters are said to have followed, to a total of 16 or 20 between 1979 and 1989.

1980 
 Elias Seixas de Mattos was a truck driver from Rio de Janeiro in 1980, when he had suffered an unexplainable experience. His story, along with the ones from his two friends, has earned an important page in the history of Brazilian Ufology because of the quantity of details he displayed to describe the situations.

1986 

A series of UFO sightings all over the states of southeastern Brazil, which led to several jet fighters being scrambled to intercept. During the attempted interceptions, pilots reported the objects capable of 90-degree turns and hypersonic flight.

1996 

 The Varginha UFO incident was an incident in Varginha, Brazil, in 1996 involving reports of unidentified flying objects and strange creatures (allegedly extraterrestrials) which were supposedly captured by Brazilian officials.
He flew around the object for some 15 minutes, keeping  of distance. The object was spinning around itself and heading towards the sea and was spotted at the radar of Infraero's room at Pelotas' airport. It was not detected by Cindacta II in Curitiba, Paraná, which was responsible for watching the skies of southern Brazil. Westendorff also reported a smaller object coming out of the top of the big UFO, which climbed into the skies at a very fast speed, with the larger UFO following shortly afterwards. The Ministry of Aeronautics kept a secret investigation of the object seen by Westendorff.

2008 
 In 2014, a document called "Dossier Riolândia" was produced by the amateur organization Inape (Instituto de Astronomia e Pesquisa Espacial (Institute of Astronomy and Space Research in Portuguese)) which allegedly shows the appearance of UFOs in the city of Riolândia on January 20, 2008.

2013 
 On 19 June, a light was visible in the sky over one of the protests in Brazil, and seen by thousands attending the event. It was reported to be a UFO, but it is currently believed to have been a drone used by local newspaper Folha de S. Paulo in order to shoot aerial images of the demonstrations.

See also 
 List of UFO sightings

References

External links 
 MUFON - Last 20 UFO Sightings and Pictures
 UFO-SIGHTINGS: The Unforgettable Experience
 Fenomenum (Brazilian site)

Historical events in Brazil